Massachusetts Route 10 is a  north–south state highway that runs from the Connecticut state line at Southwick to the New Hampshire state line at Northfield. Originally part of New England Route 10 from 1922 to 1927, it continues to the south as Connecticut Route 10, and to the north as New Hampshire Route 10.

Route description
Route 10 crosses the border from Granby, Connecticut into Southwick, Massachusetts, overlapped with U.S. 202. It runs north through the Pioneer Valley towns of Southwick, Westfield, Southampton, Easthampton, Northampton, Hatfield, Whately, Deerfield, Greenfield, Bernardston, Gill, and Northfield. During this concurrency, it closely parallels Interstate 91, with five exits from Northampton to Deerfield, with close access at Route 2 in Greenfield and another exit, solely for Route 10, in Bernardston. It crosses the Connecticut River in Northfield before entering New Hampshire.

History

An odd sight greeted motorists in Easthampton in July 2005: standard issue Alabama state highway signs with the number 10 in a map of that state, instead of the standard Massachusetts square. This odd "Alabama 10" signage came about when a contractor mistakenly applied the sample from a federal manual. The signs have since been replaced with the correct shields.

Major intersections

See also

New England Interstate Route 10

References

External links

Route 10 endpoint photos

010